Seongsan-dong is a dong, neighbourhood of the Mapo-gu district in Seoul, South Korea.

Attractions
 Seoul World Cup Stadium

See also 
Administrative divisions of South Korea

References

External links
 Mapo-gu official website in English
 Map of Mapo-gu at the Mapo-gu official website
 Map of Mapo-gu at the Mapo-gu official website
 Seongsan 1-dong resident office website

Neighbourhoods of Mapo District